Aleksandr Aleksandrovich Gaydin (born 26 October 1993) is a former Russian professional football player.

Club career
He made his Russian Football National League debut for FC Fakel Voronezh on 21 May 2012 in a game against FC KAMAZ Naberezhnye Chelny.

External links
 
 
 Career summary at sportbox.ru

1993 births
Sportspeople from Rostov-on-Don
Living people
Russian footballers
Association football defenders
FC Fakel Voronezh players
FC SKA Rostov-on-Don players